Hasora salanga, the green awl, is a butterfly belonging to the family Hesperiidae which is found in India, parts of Southeast Asia and Australia.

Description
The forewing length (base to apex) is 23mm. (male). The underside of the hindwing is green. In females upper forewing has white spots in spaces 2 and 3.

Distribution
The green awl is found in India in the Nicobar Islands and eastwards to Myanmar (Dawnas to south Myanmar), Thailand, the Malay Peninsula (Malacca), Sumatra and Borneo.

Cited references

See also
Hesperiidae
List of butterflies of India (Coeliadinae)
List of butterflies of India (Hesperiidae)

References
Print

Online

Brower, Andrew V. Z., (2007). Hasora Moore 1881. Version 21 February 2007 (under construction). Page on genus Hasora in The Tree of Life Web Project http://tolweb.org/.

Hasora
Butterflies described in 1885
Butterflies of Asia
Butterflies of Australia